Craig Krenzel (born July 1, 1981) is a former American football quarterback.  He played college football at Ohio State University.  As the starting quarterback, he led the 2002 Ohio State Buckeyes football team to a national championship.  He played professionally in the National Football League (NFL) for one season, in 2004, with the Chicago Bears.  Krenzel is currently a radio commentator for WBNS 97.1 The FAN in Columbus, which broadcasts the Ohio State Buckeyes football games.

High school career
Krenzel attended Henry Ford II High School (Sterling Heights, Mich.), and was an excellent student and a letterman in football (3 yrs), basketball (2 yrs), and baseball (1 yr). In football, as a senior, Krenzel completed 60 percent of his passes and threw for 1,760 yards and 25 touchdowns, and won USA Today honorable mention All-America accolades that year.

College career
Krenzel played in college for The Ohio State Buckeyes. After quarterback Steve Bellisari was suspended from play due to an alcohol-related police charge late in the 2001 season, Krenzel earned the starting position against Michigan and led the Buckeyes to their first win in Ann Arbor since 1987. His most successful year was 2002, when he led Ohio State to the national championship. Krenzel was 24-2 as a starter (while appearing in 27 games, appearing in relief of Scott McMullen in a loss to Illinois in 2001).

Krenzel graduated from Ohio State University with a degree in molecular genetics and a GPA of 3.75. He did research as part of a selective oncology laboratory at the Ohio State University Medical Center. Krenzel was named a First-team Academic All-American and Academic All-American of the Year, and received three Academic All-Big Ten awards, the Today's Top VIII Award, a National Football Foundation Hall of Fame post-graduate scholarship, Sporting News' Socrates Award, and the Draddy Trophy.

Krenzel's brother Brian was also talented in both academics and athletics, playing for the Duke Blue Devils football team before graduating from the University of Louisville School of Medicine.

Professional career
Krenzel was drafted in the 5th round of the 2004 NFL Draft by the Chicago Bears, for whom he played the 2004 season. Despite poor passing statistics, Krenzel won his first three starts at quarterback with the Bears, including a win over the San Francisco 49ers, which was at the time starting Ken Dorsey at quarterback, the same quarterback that started for the Miami Hurricanes during the 2003 National Championship game. However, he lost his final two starts with the Bears and injured his ankle, ending his season. In 2005, he was cut by the Bears in the offseason and he signed with the Cincinnati Bengals. He was the third-string quarterback on the team behind Carson Palmer and Jon Kitna. He was released by the Bengals in May 2006 due to an elbow injury that he sustained that eventually required Tommy John surgery.

Personal life
Krenzel now works as a commentator on 97.1 The Fan in Columbus, Ohio. Craig is known for his bit known as the "Mike Tomczak Story."

He is also a spokesman for JD Equipment and has acted in several commercial spots.

Krenzel now is a partner of the Arthur Krenzel Lett Insurance Group in Columbus, Ohio and Winfield, West Virginia. Craig Lett, his business partner, is the son of the Major League pitcher Jim Lett of the Cincinnati Reds.

References

External links
 

1981 births
Living people
American football quarterbacks
Chicago Bears players
Ohio State Buckeyes football players
William V. Campbell Trophy winners
People from Utica, Michigan
Sportspeople from Sterling Heights, Michigan
Players of American football from Michigan
Sportspeople from Metro Detroit